

Biography

Carniaux studied Mathematics at the University of Paris, from which he graduated in 1972. He then studied at Massachusetts Institute of Technology and received a B.A. in Art and Design (1974) and a Master of Architecture (1976). 

He joined Ricardo Bofill Taller de Arquitectura (RBTA) in 1976. In 1986 he was in charge of opening the firm's office in New York City, which he led until 1990. He was Senior Partner at RBTA until 2020.

Work

Jean-Pierre Carniaux’s design work has included the design of the National Theater of Catalonia, the Antigone new district in Montpellier (240,000 m2), the Shiseido representative building in Ginza, Lazona Kawasaki Plaza, as well as the design of perfume bottles for Christian Dior.

Selected projects as Senior Partner at Bofill Arquitectura

 W Barcelona, 2009, Barcelona, Spain
 Shangri.la hotel , 2008, Beijing, China
 Supershine Upper East side, 2008, Beijing, China
 La Place de l’Europe, 2007, Luxembourg
 La Porte, 2004, Luxembourg
 Corso II, 2004, Prague, Czech Republic
 Cartier headquarters, 2003, Paris, France
 Competition for Qingdao Sail Base (Olympic Games 2008), 2003, Qingdao, China
 Crystal Karlín, 2002, Prague, Czech Republic
 Logistic Park office complex, 2002, Barcelona, Spain
 Nexus II, 2002, Barcelona, Spain
 Platinum Tower, 2002, Beirut, Lebanon
 Colombo’s Resort, 2001, Porto Santo Island, Portugal
 Shiseido New Ginza Building, 2001, Tokyo, Japan
 Kawasaki Project, 2001, Tokyo, Japan
 Funchalcentrum, 2001, Funchal, Madeira, Portugal
 Compave Building, 2001, Lisbon, Portugal
 Axa Headquarters, 2000, Paris, France
 Corso, 2000, Prague, Czech Republic
 Savona Sea Port, 2000, Savona, Italy
 Corso Karlin, 2000, Prague, Czech Republic
 Nova Karlin District, 1999, Prague, Czech Republic
 Aoyama Palacio, 1999, Tokyo, Japan
 The New Port Mouth of Barcelona, 1999, Barcelona, Spain
 Crystal Palace, 1998, Prague, Czech Republic
 Manzanares Park, 1998, Madrid, Spain
 National Theatre of Catalonia, 1997, Barcelona, Spain
 Plateau Kirchberg, 1996, Luxembourg
 Piscine Olympique de Montpellier, 1996, Montpellier, France
 Reinhold Tower, 1993, Madrid, Spain
 Villa Olímpica Housing Complex, 1991, Barcelona, Spain
 Kobe Sea Port, 1991, Kobe, Japan
 Hotel Mercure, 1991, Montpellier, France
 L’Aire des Volcans, 1991, Clermont-Ferrand, France
 Le Capitole & Le Parnasse, 1990, Montpellier, France
 Port Juvenal, 1989, Montpellier, France
 Vieux Port De Montreal, 1989, Montréal, Canada
 Arsenal Music Center, 1988, Metz, France
 Domaine Chateau Lafite-Rothschild, 1988, Bordeaux, France
 Hotel de La Région Languedoc-Roussillon, 1988, Montpellier, France
 Central Park North, 1987, New York City, US
 Les Echelles de La Ville, 1986, Montpellier, France
 Port Imperial, 1985, New Jersey, US
 Corner Condominium, 1985, New York City, US
 Jefferson Tower, 1985, New York City, US
 La Place du Nombre D’Or, 1984, Montpellier, France
 Les Espaces d’Abraxas, 1983, Marne-la-Vallée, Paris, France
 Antigone District, 1978–2000, Montpellier, France

See also
 Peter Hodgkinson (architect)
 Nabil Gholam

References

External links
Ricardo Bofill's Website
Abertis, Barcelona
Chicago Tribune
Hotel W Barcelona (PDF)
Les Espaces d’Abraxas
Interview Ricardo Bofill and Jean-Pierre Carniaux about Antigone 

1951 births
Living people